Dzidra Uztupe-Karamiševa (née  Uztupe; 2 May 1930 – 27 December 2014) was a Latvian basketball player and coach. During her career Uztupe-Karamiševa won three FIBA European Champions Cups and four Soviet League titles. She represented the Soviet Union national team and won four EuroBasket tournaments.

Career
Uztupe was born on 2 May 1930 in Smiltene, Latvia, and spent her youth in the Pārdaugava area of Riga. She attended the Riga Secondary School No. 5 where she took up basketball, volleyball and track and field. She held the Latvian record in high jump among girls and was the champion in both high jump and volleyball.

Uztupe joined Daugava Riga in 1947 and played with the team until 1958. In 1958, she joined TTT Riga and served as the team's captain. She won the FIBA European Champions Cup three times and became a Soviet League champion in four consecutive seasons.

References

1930 births
2014 deaths
Latvian Academy of Sport Education alumni
Latvian women's basketball players